The Mini is a small economy car made by the British Motor Corporation (BMC) and its successors from 1959 to 2000.

Mini may also refer to:

Automobile
Mini (marque), an English automotive marque, subsidiary of German carmaker BMW, successor of the original Mini
Innocenti Mini, an Italian version of the original Mini produced by Leyland Innocenti
Mini Hatch, a Mini model built by BMW from 2001 to present
Mini Moke, a vehicle similar to a beach buggy, based on the Mini car

People
 Mini (singer), Japanese model and singer
 Mini Jakobsen, former Norwegian footballer
 Vuyisile Mini (1920–1964), South African anti-apartheid activist
 Anthony Minichiello, Australian rugby league player

Other uses
 Mini (EP), an EP by The Wedding Present
 Mini (1995 film), a Malayalam film
 Mini (2022 film), a Bengali film
 Mini (frog), a genus endemic to Madagascar
 Miniature figure (gaming), a small-scale figure in miniature wargames, role-playing games, and dioramas
 Minicomputer, a class of special multi-user computers
 iPod Mini, portable MP3 player from Apple Inc., predecessor to the iPod nano
 Mac Mini, an ultra-compact Apple Macintosh computer case
 iPad Mini, compact version of 4th generation iPad tablet
iPhone 12 mini, compact version of the iPhone 12
 Mobile Mini (NASDAQ stock symbol MINI), an American portable storage company
 PlayStation minis, a range of mini games developed for Sony consoles
 Mini chopper, scaled-down custom-built versions of chopper motorcycles
 Ruger Mini-14, Mini-30, or Mini-6.8 carbines
 Minigun
 Moulton Mini, a bicycle by Moulton Bicycle
 Google Home Mini/Nest Mini
HomePod mini
 Mini-international neuropsychiatric interview, a short structured clinical interview

See also
 Maxi (disambiguation)
 MIDI (disambiguation)
 Miniature (disambiguation)
 Minicar (disambiguation)
 Minié (disambiguation)
 Miniș (disambiguation)
 Minnie (disambiguation)
 Minny (disambiguation)
 Supermini (disambiguation)